Juan Richard Turner is a British Broadcaster, radio and television producer and freelance cameraman and business owner, he was also a Member of the Legislative Council of the Isle of Man.

IOM Government Department Memberships 
 Department of Trade and Industry, 2007–09
 Department of Transport, 2008–10
 Department of Tourism and Leisure, 2009–09
 Department of Agriculture, Fisheries and Forestry, 2009–10
 Department of Community, Culture and Leisure, 2010–
 Department of Environment, Food and Agriculture, 2010–2014
 Department of Infrastructure, 2014-2016
 Department of Home Affairs, 2016–18

References

1974 births
British radio presenters
British radio producers
British television producers
Living people
Manx businesspeople
Manx politicians